Jacobin is an American political magazine based in New York. It offers socialist perspectives on politics, economics and culture. As of 2021, the magazine reported a paid print circulation of 75,000 and over 3 million monthly visitors.

History and overview 
The publication began as an online magazine released in September 2010, expanding into a print journal later that year. Jacobin founder Bhaskar Sunkara describes Jacobin as a radical publication being "largely the product of a younger generation not quite as tied to the Cold War paradigms that sustained the old leftist intellectual milieux like Dissent or New Politics, but still eager to confront, rather than table, the questions that arose from the experience of the left in the 20th century".

In 2014, Sunkara said that the aim of the magazine was to create a publication which combined resolutely socialist politics with the accessibility of titles such as The Nation and The New Republic. He has also contrasted it to publications associated with small leftist groups, such as the International Socialist Organization's Socialist Worker and International Socialist Review which were oriented towards party members and other revolutionary socialists, seeking a broader audience than those works while still anchoring the magazine in a Marxist perspective. In an interview he gave in 2018, Sunkara said that he intended for Jacobin to perform a similar role on the contemporary left to that undertaken by National Review on the post-war right, i.e. "to cohere people around a set of ideas, and to interact with the mainstream of liberalism with that set of ideas".

Jacobins popularity grew with the increasing attention on leftist ideas stimulated by Bernie Sanders' 2016 presidential campaign, with subscriptions tripling from 10,000 in the summer of 2015 to 32,000 as of the first issue of 2017, with 16,000 of the new subscribers being added in the two months after Donald Trump's election.

In late 2016, Jacobins editorial team unionized, including a total of seven full- and part-time members. An associate editor and co-chair of the union explained that Jacobin had only recently had enough full-time members to warrant unionization.

In spring 2017, Jacobin launched a peer-reviewed journal, Catalyst: A Journal of Theory and Strategy, which is today edited by New York University professor Vivek Chibber and a small editorial board. As of 2022, Catalyst claims a subscriber base of 7,500.

In November 2018, the magazine's first foreign-language edition, Jacobin Italia, was launched. Sunkara described it as "a classic franchise model", with the parent publication providing publishing and editorial advice and taking a small slice of revenue, but otherwise granting the Italian magazine autonomy. A Brazilian edition appeared in 2019, and a German version started publishing in 2020; the latter grew out of Ada, an independent online magazine established in 2018 which primarily published translations of Jacobin articles. The first issue of the German edition featured interviews with Kevin Kühnert and Grace Blakeley. A Spanish-language version of Jacobin, Jacobin América Latina, was also launched in 2020.

In April 2020, Jacobin launched its YouTube channel featuring the Weekends program with Michael Brooks and Ana Kasparian. Brooks died suddenly in July 2020.

In May 2020, some time after Bernie Sanders suspended his 2020 presidential campaign, Sanders' former adviser and speechwriter David Sirota joined Jacobin as editor-at-large.

In 2020, Jacobin became an affiliated member of the Progressive International.

Title and logo 
The name of the magazine derives from the 1938 book The Black Jacobins: Toussaint L'Ouverture and the San Domingo Revolution by C. L. R. James in which James ascribes the Haitian revolutionists a greater purity in regards to their attachment to the ideals of the French Revolution than the French Jacobins. The conservative religious journal First Things criticized Jacobin'''s claim to represent Toussaint Louverture, pointing to Louverture's devout Catholicism, opposition to the massacres of former slave owners, and his actions to the former slaves of the colonies.

According to creative director Remeike Forbes, the magazine's frequently used "Black Jacobin" logo was inspired by a scene in the movie Burn! referring to Nicaraguan national hero José Dolores Estrada.

 Contributors 
Notable Jacobin contributors have included Kristen Ghodsee, Slavoj Žižek, Yanis Varoufakis, Hilary Wainwright, Kareem Abdul-Jabbar, Jeremy Corbyn, Pablo Iglesias Turrión and Jon Trickett. Sunkara has said he feels that "all of our writers fit within a broad socialist tradition", noting that the magazine does sometimes publish articles by liberals and social democrats, but that such pieces are written from a perspective that is consistent with the magazine's editorial vision, saying that "we might publish a piece by a liberal advocating single-payer healthcare, because they’re calling for the decommodification of a sector; and since we believe in the decommodification of the whole economy, it fits in". In terms of the sociological background of contributors, Sunkara acknowledged that they were mostly under the age of 35 and stated that "there are a lot of grad students, young adjunct professors or tenured professors. We also have quite a few organizers and union researchers involved [...] and people working in NGOs or around housing rights, that kind of thing".

 Ideology and reception Jacobin has been variously described as democratic socialist, socialist and Marxist. Writing for the New Statesman in November 2013, Max Strasser suggested that Jacobin claims to "take the mantle of Marxist thought of Ralph Miliband and a similar vein of democratic socialism". According to an article published in September 2014 by the Nieman Journalism Lab, Jacobin is a journal of "democratic socialist thought".

In January 2013, The New York Times ran a profile of Bhaskar Sunkara, commenting on the publication's unexpected success and engagement with mainstream liberalism. In an October 2013 article for Tablet, Michelle Goldberg discussed Jacobin as part of a revival of interest in Marxism among young intellectuals. In February 2016, Jake Blumgart, who contributed to the magazine in its early years, stated that it "found an audience by mixing data-driven analysis and Marxist commentary with an irreverent and accessible style".

In a 2014 interview published in New Left Review, Sunkara named a number of ideological influences on the magazine, including Michael Harrington, whom he described as "very underrated as a popularizer of Marxist thought"; Ralph Miliband and others such as Leo Panitch who were influenced by Trotskyism without fully embracing it; theorists working in the Eurocommunist tradition; and "Second International radicals" including Vladimir Lenin and Karl Kautsky.

In April 2016, Noam Chomsky called the magazine "a bright light in dark times".

In a March 2018 article published in the Weekly Worker, Jim Creegan highlighted the association of a number of the magazine's editors and writers with the Democratic Socialists of America (DSA), describing Jacobin'' as "the closest thing to a flagship publication of the DSA left" whilst also stressing the political diversity of contributors, incorporating "everyone from social democratic liberals to avowed revolutionaries". He also noted several features of the publication's editorial stance, namely its rejection of anti-communism; its skepticism regarding the possibility of the Democratic Party being transformed into a social-democratic movement through internal pressure, advocating instead the formation of a mass-based independent labor party; criticism of the parties of the Socialist International, which they argue have been responsible for imposing neoliberal austerity policies; and a conviction that the Nordic model of social democracy is ultimately not viable and that the only alternative to capitalism would be for militant labor and socialist movements to struggle to replace capitalism with socialism.

The publication has also received criticism by some leftists who view some of its editorial stances as insufficiently Marxist or even anti-socialist. The perception that the publication lacks diversity among working class and minorities has also been criticized, as it has been said to be largely a publication for affluent and upper-middle class whites.

References

Further reading

External links 

 
 Jacobin YouTube channel
 Weekends with Michael Brooks and Ana Kasparian
 Stay at Home
 

2010 establishments in New York City
Jacobin
Magazines published in New York City
Marxist magazines
Political magazines published in the United States
Jacobin
Jacobin
Jacobin